One Night... A Train is a 1968 Belgian-French drama film directed by André Delvaux, starring Yves Montand and Anouk Aimée. It tells the story of Mathias, a professor of linguistics at a university where the students have lively discussions about Flemish nationalism and morality. During a train ride, the French-speaking woman who Mathias lives with disappears and he goes looking for her in an unknown city. The film is based on the novel De trein der traagheid by Johan Daisne.

Cast
 Yves Montand as Mathias
 Anouk Aimée as Anne
 Adriana Bogdan as Moira
 Hector Camerlynck as Hernhutter
 François Beukelaers as Val
 Michael Gough as Jeremiah
 Senne Rouffaer as Elckerlyc
 Domien De Gruyter as Werner
 Jan Peré as Henrik

Reception
Aurélien Ferenczi of Télérama wrote in 2009: "The cleverness of the film is how it finds unusual visual equivalents to classic themes of 60s auteur cinema—-at the heart, we are very close to Antonioni. Yves Montand and Anouk Aimée are terrific, and One Night... A Train is perhaps, quite simply, its director's best film."

Box office
According to Fox records the film required $1,650,000 in rentals to break even and by 11 December 1970 had made $525,000 so made a loss to the studio.

References

External links

1968 drama films
1968 films
Belgian drama films
1960s Dutch-language films
Films based on Belgian novels
Films directed by André Delvaux
Films scored by Frédéric Devreese
French drama films
1960s French-language films
1960s multilingual films
Belgian multilingual films
French multilingual films
1960s French films